"Naughty Girl" is the first single from the 2007 television series Summer Heights High. It is performed by one of the show's leads, Mr G, portrayed by Chris Lilley as well as Kelly Dingledei, who plays Candice/Jessica in the show. The song appears on the musical's soundtrack, available from ABC Shops and iTunes.

Background
The song featured in the Australian mockumentary school series Summer Heights High, following the death of one of the students at the school. The song is sung by Chris Lilley (Mr G), who starred as the three main characters in the programme.

Track listing
CD singleVirgin (EMI) #5218992
"Naughty Girl"
"Naughty Girl" (Jessica's Addiction Remix)
"Naughty Girl" (Styalz Fuego Remix)
"Naughty Girl" (Paul Mac's Extended 12")
"Naughty Girl" (Cloud Club Remix)
"Naughty Girl" (a cappella)

Music video
The music video for "Naughty Girl" was released on 17 March 2008. The video shows various people from Australia (including some of the cast of Summer Heights High) dancing and lip syncing to the words of the song.

Charts

Weekly charts

Year-end charts

References

2008 singles
Comedy songs
2008 songs
Songs about drugs